Bondaran (also Romanized as Bondārān and Bāndārān; also known as Bāndrān, Bonārdān, and Bundrām) is a village in Sirik Rural District, Byaban District, Minab County, Hormozgan Province, Iran. At the 2006 census, its population was 599, in 128 families.

References 

Populated places in Minab County